Pełczyce  is a village in the administrative district of Gmina Kobierzyce, within Wrocław County, Lower Silesian Voivodeship, in south-western Poland. Prior to 1945 it was in Germany. It is inhabited by 285 people (according to 2015 survey).

References

Villages in Wrocław County